Castelnau-Montratier-Sainte-Alauzie (Languedocien: Castèlnau de Montratièr e Senta Alàusia) is a commune in the department of Lot, southern France. The municipality was established on 1 January 2017, by merger of the former communes of Castelnau-Montratier (the seat) and Sainte-Alauzie.

See also 
Communes of the Lot department

References 

Communes of Lot (department)